The Kingman Training: Eraser / Chaser are .43 caliber. (11mm) paintball pistols utilizing a Reversal Striker Valve (RSV) system. The KT marker gives a simulated weight and feel, comparable to a real hand pistol.

Both the Eraser and Chaser markers are of similar construction. The Eraser is an all-aluminum construction with a slightly longer design, while the Chaser has aluminum and composite material (grip frame), with a slightly shorter body.

Marker features 
 Reversal Striker Valve System (Patent 7,478,632)
 Magazine Style Loading System (each hold 9 rounds)
 Velocity Range:   (Joules: 1.6-2.0)
 CO2 Cartridge knob with assist lever
 External Velocity Adjuster
 Simulated Cocking Action
 Durable Anodized Fine Matte Finish
 Fixed  Hard Sights
 Quick Release Striker Bolt
 Slide Cocking System
 Ergonomically Designed Aluminum Trigger Frame (composite material for the Chaser)
 Rubber Grip Panel

Propellant 
The Eraser and Chaser both operate using 12 gram CO2 cartridges as the power source.  The cartridges are loaded into the gas cylinder and screwed into the grip, keeping the weight in the pistol more balanced, and reducing the size of the front end of the marker.  Each cartridge is capable of firing 60-80 shots (depending on the temperature).

See also 
 Paintball
 Paintball pistol
 Scenario Paintball
 Woodsball
 Milsim
 List of paintball markers

References 

Paintball markers